Pteropelyx (meaning "winged pelvis") is a dubious genus of Late Cretaceous hadrosaurid dinosaur from the Judith River Formation of Montana, named by Edward Drinker Cope in 1889. Historically, several species were assigned to it, all based on extremely fragmentary remains, but there is no evidence to support these assignments, making the type species, P. grallipes, the only valid species. Most of these other species' remains likely belong to better-known hadrosaurs, such as Lambeosaurus and Gryposaurus.  It is probable that the type material of Pteropelyx, a skeleton lacking a skull, is from Corythosaurus (making Pteropelyx its senior synonym) (Brett-Surman, 1989), but the lack of a skull makes such a synonymy impossible to determine with sure certainty as no certain evidence pertain to prove the organ to be present.

See also

 Timeline of hadrosaur research

References

Lambeosaurines
Late Cretaceous dinosaurs of North America
Fossil taxa described in 1889
Taxa named by Edward Drinker Cope
Nomina dubia
Paleontology in Montana
Campanian genus first appearances
Campanian genus extinctions
Ornithischian genera